Borj Sidi Makhlouf is a fort in the city of Rabat, Morocco. It was first established in the 17th century and was destroyed in 1637 but conserved its shape.  It is located in the cliff of the Bouregreg river and marked the transition from Andalusian to military architecture.

References

Forts in Morocco
16th-century fortifications

'Alawi architecture